The women's 50 kilometres walk at the 2017 World Championships in Athletics was held on a 2 kilometre course comprising lengths of The Mall between Buckingham Palace and Admiralty Arch on 13 August.

Summary
This was the first time women were offered this event in the world championships, finally equalizing all events for both genders. Only seven women toed the start line. With the event in its infancy, Inês Henriques (POR) had set the world record in January.

From the start, Henriques was dominating the race though Yin Hang (CHN) was with her virtually stride for stride through the halfway point. Two years prior to this becoming an IAAF ratified event, Erin Taylor-Talcott held the world record. Here she was disqualified early on, after the 5k mark. Behind the lead pack, a chase pack formed by Yang Shuqing (CHN), Katie Burnett (USA) and Nair da Rosa (BRA) walking closely together past 15k before da Rosa fell off the pace. Shortly after the half way mark, Burnett fell off Yang's pace, but she didn't go away. By 35k, Burnett was 50 seconds behind Yang, but she pulled it back, getting within breathing room of Yang as the race was closing in the last 5k.

Henriques continued to widen her lead to over three minutes on Yin. Yin managed to pull back a few seconds over the final 5k, finishing less than a minute short of Henriques' previous world record, but Henriques took two and a half minutes off of that record with this win in 4:05:56. After a scare, Yang opened up a minute over the last 5k on Burnett for bronze. Both silver medalist Yin and fourth place Burnett set their respective continental records.

Records
Before the competition records were as follows:

The following records were set at the competition:

Qualification standard
The standard to qualify automatically for entry was 4:30:00.

Results
The final took place on 13 August at 07:46. The results were as follows:

References

50 km walk
Racewalking at the World Athletics Championships